Murtuja Yahubhi Vahora (born 1 December 1985) is an Indian first-class cricketer who plays for Baroda in domestic cricket. He is a right-arm medium-fast bowler.

References 

Living people
1985 births
Indian cricketers
Baroda cricketers
West Zone cricketers
People from Vadodara